Star One C1 is a Brazilian communications satellite. It was launched on 14 November 2007 by an Ariane 5ECA carrier rocket, as part of a dual-payload launch with Skynet 5B. It was built by Thales Alenia Space, based on the Spacebus-3000B3 satellite bus. It is operated by Star One, a subsidiary of Embratel.

Overview

It was launched atop an Ariane 5-ECA rocket at 22:06 UTC on November 14, 2007. This launch had previously been delayed from November 9 due to a problem with the rocket, and then from November 12 due to a problem with the launch pad. Star One C1 was built by Thales Alenia Space based on a Spacebus 3000 B3 platform.

See also

 Star One (satellite operator)
 Star One C2
 Star One C3

References

External links
 Star One C1 at LyngSat
 
 Star One C1 coverage maps as files.
 Star One C1 coverage maps on Google Maps.
 Star One C1 realtime tracking.

Communications satellites in geostationary orbit
Spacecraft launched in 2007
Satellites using the Spacebus bus
Star One satellites